Robert, Rob or Bob McCullough may refer to:

 Bob McCullough (sports administrator) (1931–2017), Australian sports administrator
 Bob McCullough (basketball), American basketball player
 Bob McCullough (cricketer) (1943–2020), New Zealand cricketer
 Rob McCullough (born 1977), American mixed martial artist

See also
 Bob McCullogh (1892–1972), English footballer
 Robert McCulloch (disambiguation)